Jukums Vācietis (Ioakim Ioakimovich Vatsetis; 23 November [O.S. 11 November] 1873 – 28 July 1938) was a Latvian Soviet military commander. He was a rare example of a notable Soviet leader who was not a member of the Communist Party (or of any other political party), until his demise during the Great Purge in the 1930s.

Early life
Jukums Vācietis's family were Latvian labourers. From about the age of six, he worked as a shepherd and as a labourer, while he was a pupil at the Šķēde Parish School. In 1889–91, he studied at the Ministry of Kuldīga school. At the same time, he worked in a match factory.

Military career
Vācietis started his military career in Imperial Russia in 1891, and reached the rank of second lieutenant after graduating from infantry cadet school in 1895. In 1914, at the start of World War I, he saw as a battalion commander in Poland and East Prussia, and was wounded several times. After hospital treatment, he was promoted to the rank of colonel. From October 1916, he commanded the 5th Latvian Zemgale Rifle Regiment and distinguished himself during the defence of Riga against the advancing German army in August 1916.

Vācietis was not involved in any political activity before 1917, but after the October Revolution, he immediately sided with the new Bolshevik government, and was given command of the 12th army. From April 1918, Vācietis was the commander of the Red Latvian Riflemen division, which was then the most reliable unit under Bolshevik control. He played a critical role in July 1918 in suppressing a revolt by the Left Socialist-Revolutionaries, who opposed the decision to end the war with Germany. From July to September 1918, Vācietis commanded the Eastern Front, which he created out of scattered units fighting for the Bolsheviks in Siberia against the White Army and the Czechoslovak Legion. During his two months as commander of the front, the Red Army scored its first major victory of the Russian Civil War by recapturing Kazan.

On 2 September 1918, Vācietis was appointed the first commander-in-chief of the Red Army (RKKA), and a member of the Revolutionary Military Council - but became embroiled in a dispute with Sergey Kamenev, his successor as commander of the Eastern Front, which was intertwined with power struggles within the Bolshevik party leadership, in which Leon Trotsky, the Commissar for Military and Naval Affairs, backed Vācietis, and Joseph Stalin backed Kamenev. Trotsky later wrote that

In summer 1919, Vācietis proposed that the Eastern Front should halt military operations having reach the Urals, so that troops could be transferred to the south for the campaign against General Denikin, and the Don Cossacks, but Kamenev insisted that they could spare troops for the southern front and still advance past the Urals into Siberia. He was proved right, and on 3 July 1919, Kamenev replaced Vācietis as commander-in-chief of the Red Army. On 8 July 1919, Vācietis was arrested under the accusation of membership in a counter-revolutionary reactionary White Guardist organization, but was soon released when the charge was proved false. Trotsky suspected that "dissatisfied with his removal from the post of Commander-in-Chief, he had engaged in reckless talk with officers close to him." He also believed that Stalin was behind Vācietis's arrest.

In 1922, Vācietis became a professor of the RKKA Military Academy (future Frunze Military Academy). During this time, he wrote several books, most notable among them being 'Latvian Riflemen's Historical Importance'. In 1935, Vācietis was assigned a personal rank of Comandarm, 2nd Rank.

On 29 November 1937, during the height of Stalin's Great Purge, Vācietis was arrested as a member of the alleged "Latvian Fascist Organization within the RKKA", and was executed on 28 July 1938. Vācietis was rehabilitated in 1957.

Literature

References

1873 births
1938 deaths
People from Saldus Municipality
People from Courland Governorate
Soviet komandarms of the second rank
Recipients of the Order of the Red Star
Recipients of the Order of the Red Banner
Latvian Riflemen
Military personnel of the Russian Empire
Russian military personnel of World War I
People of the Russian Civil War
Great Purge victims from Latvia
Soviet rehabilitations
Soviet people of the Ukrainian–Soviet War